Brotherhood is a political novel written by Senegalese writer Mohamed Mbougar Sarr and translated by Alexia Trigo. It was published by Europa Editions in 2021. Originally published as Terre Ceinte in 2014 by Présence Africaine.

The novel takes place in a fictional town in Africa, where Islamic extremism has taken root.

Background 
In 2014, Mohamed Mbougar Sarr's novel was published by Présence Africaine in French. It was Sarr's debut novel and second work after his critically acclaimed short story "La Cale". In 2021, it was translated by Alexia Trigo—being Trigo's debut work as a translator and Sarr's first novel to be translated into English.

Plot 
The story follows an extremist Islamic organisation—called the Brotherhood, which has taken control of Kalep—and a group of decentralised intellectuals intent on challenging its extreme religious doctrine. The antagonist, Abdel Karim who is a police chief, leads the Brotherhood.
In order to fight the tyrant, the intellectuals develop a political journal called Rambaaj that is aimed at reawakening the people and calling for an uprising.
To fight back, Karim places a huge bounty on the underground journalists which introduces betrayal and back-biting to the organisation. In order to winnow out the journalists, Karim burns down a library that is considered a cultural property.

Characters 
 Abdel Karim — a police chief and leader of the Brotherhood
 Malamine — leader of the resistance group

Reception 
It received a starred review from Publishers Weekly. PW described it as a "vital new voice to American readers." It was listed in Brittle Paper's Notable Books of 2021.

Awards and nominations 
The French version won the Grand prix du roman métis and Prix Ahmadou-Kourouma in 2015.

References 

2014 novels
2014 debut novels
French-language novels
Senegalese novels
Novels set in fictional countries